Deinogalerix (from Ancient Greek, "terrible/terror" + Galerix) is an extinct genus of gymnure which lived in Italy in the Late Miocene, 7-10 million years ago. The genus was apparently endemic to what was then the island of Gargano, which is now a peninsula. The first specimens of Deinogalerix were first described in 1972.

The genus is in the hedgehog subfamily of gymnures or moon-rats, which are not rats at all, but rather hairy, superficially rat-like relatives of the hedgehog lacking quills. Deinogalerix had a long, thin, conical face, small pointed ears, a lengthy, tapering tail and long hairs.
 

It occupied the same ecological niche as dogs and cats today, except that it had more predators itself - such as the enormous barn owl Tyto gigantea.

It is believed that the species of Deinogalerix were insectivores, mostly feeding off invertebrates like beetles, dragonflies and crickets, and possibly even snails. But the larger species may also have hunted small mammals, reptiles and birds.

In the Late Miocene subepoch, what is at present Italy was mainly a group of small islands and only at a later date did majority of these join with the mainland. It is known that animals on these islands sometimes evolved quite differently from elsewhere. So it is possible that Deinogalerix may have lived exclusively in the Gargano.

References

External links

 The deinogalerix and other prehistoric creatures.
 Image of the deinogalerix.
 Mikko's Phylogeny Archive

Gymnures
Prehistoric Eulipotyphla
Miocene mammals of Europe
Prehistoric placental genera
Fossil taxa described in 1972